Orchistoma is a genus of cnidarians belonging to the monotypic family Orchistomatidae.

The species of this genus are found in Europe, Northern America and Australia.

Species:

Orchistoma agariciforme 
Orchistoma collapsum 
Orchistoma manam 
Orchistoma mauropoda 
Orchistoma nubiae 
Orchistoma pileus

References

Leptothecata
Hydrozoan genera